A weed is an unwanted plant of any species.

Weed or weeds may also refer to:

Places
 Weed, Arkansas, an unincorporated community in the United States
 Weed, California, a city in the United States
 Weed, Kentucky, an unincorporated community in the United States
 Weed, New Mexico, an unincorporated community and census-designated place in the United States
 Weed Lake, a wetland in Calgary County, Alberta, Canada

Arts, entertainment, and media

Film and television
 Weeds (1987 film), starring Nick Nolte
 Weeds (2017 film), an animated short film featuring an anthropomorphic dandelion
 Weeds (TV series), an American dark comedy television series about a drug-dealing suburban soccer mom
 "Weeds" (Millennium), an episode of the TV series Millennium

Music
 Weed Records, a short-lived R&B label of Motown
 The Weeds (UK band), a 1980s indie pop band
 The Lollipop Shoppe, later The Weeds, a 1960s American garage band
 Weed (album), a 2004 Chris Whitley album
 Weeds (album), a 1969 album by Brewer & Shipley
 "Weeds", a song by Marina and the Diamonds from Froot
 "Weeds", a song by Victoria Williams from Swing the Statue!

Other uses in arts, entertainment, and media
 Weed (manga), a Japanese manga series
 "Weeds" (short story), a 1976 story by Stephen King
 WEED (AM), a radio station in Rocky Mount, North Carolina, United States
 The Weeds, a policy- and news-analysis podcast from Vox

Other uses
 Weed (surname)
 Weed (cannabis), a common slang word for marijuana
 Weeds Act 1959, an Act of the Parliament of the United Kingdom
 Canopy Growth (TSX: WEED), Canadian cannabis company

See also